Michael D. Aeschliman (born 21 February 1948) is a U.S.–Swiss educator, literary critic and scholar, Professor Emeritus at Boston University, Professor of Anglophone Culture at the Università della Svizzera italiana (University of Italian Switzerland) and Curriculum Advisor to The American School in Switzerland (TASIS) Foundation Board.

Biography 
He is one of the four sons of the Swiss-American Protestant minister, linguist, aviator, soldier, college professor, and writer Rev. Adrien R. Aeschliman (1899–1981) and Dorothy G. (Schumacher) Aeschliman (1919–2006). Aeschliman taught at the University of Virginia from 1985 to 1993. He was a very popular undergraduate teacher and in 1990 the University of Virginia student weekly newsmagazine “The Declaration” featured him as the ”Hottest/Coolest Male Professor” in the university. He ran a summer institute in Italy for the university's Jefferson Scholars Program, 1996–2009, and also taught at the Catholic University of Milan (Università Cattolica del Sacro Cuore) and the Université populaire de Lausanne. He completed the college preparatory program and graduated from Tilton School (NH) in 1966. Aeschliman holds B.A., M.A., M.Phil., and Ph.D. degrees from Columbia University (New York), where he studied with Edward W. Tayler, Joseph A. Mazzeo, Lionel Trilling, and Fritz Stern.

Aeschliman is the author of The Restoration of Man: C. S. Lewis and the Continuing Case against Scientism (3rd. edition, 2019; translated into French, 2020), which has been described by National Review (NY) as "a book marked by tremendous learning worn lightly, deployed vigorously, and offered generously to a generation that has forgotten how to think because it has lost its grip on the meaning of words." The major French daily newspaper Le Figaro also hailed its publication, describing it as a work that "at long last makes accessible to the general reading public the essential reflections of C. S. Lewis on scientism and transhumanism." The first edition was prefaced by the prominent journalist and intellectual Malcolm Muggeridge and praised by Russell Kirk as "One of the most perceptive books on C. S. Lewis," and "A succinct, strong book, worthy of Lewis himself." Rowan Williams, the former Archbishop of Canterbury (2002–2012) wrote that: "The long overdue reappraisal of C.S. Lewis as a serious social critic and public intellectual has been much helped by Michael Aeschliman's incisive monograph."

Aeschliman writes regularly on educational and cultural topics for several American magazines, including National Review, First Things, Modern Age, Crisis Magazine  and The Journal of Education (Boston). His work has also been published in Essays in Criticism (Oxford), The Literary Criterion (Mysore, India), Semiotica (Toronto), The Imaginative Conservative, The University Bookman (Mecosta, Michigan), L'Analisi Linguistica e Letteraria (Milan) and Evolution News and Science Today (Seattle).  His evocative analysis of the deleterious impact of television in Tuscany, "A cold, gray glow" (Harper's, 1985), attracted early attention to his views. He has been a contributing author of This Will Hurt - The Restoration of Virtue & Civic Order and The C. S. Lewis Readers' Encyclopedia. He is featured in the film "The Magician's Twin: C.S. Lewis and the Case against Scientism" (2012) In addition to C.S. Lewis, Aeschliman has written and lectured extensively about G. K. Chesterton, T. S. Eliot, F. R. Leavis and John Henry Newman. In 1987, he brought out and introduced a new edition of Malcolm Muggeridge's 1934 satirical-documentary novel Winter in Moscow, and in 2012 he brought out a new critical edition of Dickens's classic 1859 novel on the French Revolution, A Tale of Two Cities. He has lectured by invitation in recent years at Cambridge and Yale Universities.

Selected publications

Books and articles since 2011 

 "A Contemporary Erasmus: Peter L. Berger," Modern Age, Vol. 53, No.3 (Summer 2011)
 "Apocalyptic Witness and Wit," review of Malcolm Muggeridge, Time and Eternity, National Review, 15 August 2011
 "Science Illuminated," review of James LeFanu, Why Us? How Science Rediscovered the Mystery of  Ourselves, Modern Age, Vol. 53, No.4 (Fall 2011)
 "Theodor Haecker," Crisis Magazine, 9 April 2012 
 "How the Poles Saved Civilization, Parts I and II," Crisis Magazine, 28–29 May 2012 
 "C.S. Lewis, Scientism, and the Battle of the Books," Second Spring (Oxford), 15 (2012)
 "C.S. Lewis on Mere Science" and "C.S. Lewis, Scientism, and the Battle of the Books," ch. 2 and 13 in The Magician's Twin: C.S. Lewis on Science, Scientism, and Society, ed. John G. West (Seattle: Discovery Institute Press, 2012)
 "The Return of History," review of  K.B. McIntyre, Herbert Butterfield: History, Providence, and Skeptical Politics,  Crisis Magazine, 11 July 2012 
 Editor, Charles Dickens, A Tale of Two Cities. San Francisco: Ignatius Critical Editions, 2012 
 "Natural Law or Nihilism?" "The Best of the Bookman," The University Bookman, September 2012 
 "T.S. Eliot," reprint of Encyclopedia article, First Principles: ISI Web Journal, 9/26/2012
 "Dr. Valiant-for-Truth," eulogy of Dr. John Silber, National Review Online, 13 October 2012 
 "Dickens at 200," National Review, 15 October 2012
 "Rationality vs. Darwinism," review of Thomas Nagel, Mind and Cosmos: Why the Materialist Neo-Darwinian Conception of Nature Is Almost Certainly False, National Review, 12 November 2012
 "Parents vs. the State," review of Charles L. Glenn, Contrasting Models of State and School: A Comparative Historical Study of Parental Choice and State Control, Crisis Magazine, 23 November 2012 
 "Vignette: '68 Revolutionaries Revisited," National Review Online, 5 July 2013 
 "The Shock of the True" (on G.K. Chesterton), Essays in Criticism (Oxford), 2013: 63 (3): 352–359
 Reprint of previous, "The Shock of the True," The Chesterton Review, Vol.40, Nos.3&4, Fall/Winter 2014, pp. 539–545.
 "Darkness and Light in Avignon," National Review Online, 10 August 2013 
 "The Greatest Painting?" National Review Online, 21 September 2013 
 "Restoring Our K-12 Schools: Education, history, and E.D. Hirsch," National Review Online, 18 October 2013 
 "C.S. Lewis: Jack the Giant-Killer,"  National Review Online, 22 November 2013 
 "Dispelling the Grand Illusion: The unwelcome witness of Pierre Duhem," National Review Online, 21 December 2013 
 "Podhoretz vs. the Nihilists: He understood the "bohemian know-nothings" very early," National Review Online, 18 January 2014 
 "St. Socrates, pray for us," National Review Online, 15 February 2014 
 "Human Rights in Midair," National Review Online, 29 March 2014 
 "Tocqueville and Democracy: Encore," Modern Age (USA), Vol.56, No.2 (Spring 2014), pp. 70–74.
 "A Texan to the Rescue" (Dr. John Silber), National Review (NY), 5 May 2014, pp. 38–9.
 "Gustave Doré in Springtime Paris," National Review Online, (NY), 3 May 2014 
 "Two Roadside Abductions: From ethics to "enlightenment"---and back again?" National Review Online (NY), 5 July 2014 
 "Seventy Years Ago in Italy," National Review Online, 16 August 2014 
 "The Moral Imagination of Russell Kirk," National Review Online, 27 September 2014: 
 "High Culture vs. Justice," review of Alexander Lee, The Ugly Renaissance, National Review, 22 December 2014
 "Civilization: Mother, Child, and Language---the Human Figure in the Landscape," National Review Online, 20 December 2014 
 "A Dark Angel and His Masterpiece: Aldous Huxley and Brave New World," L'Analisi Linguistica e Letteraria (Milano), Anno XXIII (2015), pp. 35–46.
 "Midcentury Mores," review of Edward Mendelson, Moral Agents: Eight Twentieth-Century American Writers, National Review, 23 February 2015
 "A Midcentury Journey," on Morris Dickstein; National Review Online, 21 February 2015 
 "Dissociation of Sensibility: The German Tragedy Revisited," St. Austin Review (USA), 15, 2 (March/April 2015)
 "The Way We Teach Today," review of Bauerlein and Bellow, eds., The State of the American Mind, National Review, 6 July 2015.
 "Witness against the Age of Irony," review of  Randy Boyagoda, Richard John Neuhaus: A Life in the Public Square, Modern Age, 57, 4 (Fall 2015), pp. 65–9
 "Hamilton and Jefferson: The Deserving and the Deserter," National Review Online, 31 October 2015 
 "Remembering Moynihan," review of G. Weiner, American Burke: The Uncommon Liberalism of Daniel Patrick Moynihan, Chronicles (Illinois), December 2015, pp. 27–9
 "Reading Piers Paul Read," National Review Online, 12 December 2015: see M.D. Aeschliman, National Review Online, archive>
 "Mary Shelley among the Radicals," National Review Online, 16 April 2016: see <M.D. Aeschliman, National Review Online, archive>
 "Beyond the Language of the Living," review of The Poems of T.S. Eliot: The Annotated Text, ed. Christopher Ricks and Jim McCue, National Review (print ed.), 13 June 2016, pp. 37–38
 "Three Great Critics: F.R. Leavis, T.S. Eliot, and C.S. Lewis," lecture delivered at Downing College, Cambridge University, September 2015; printed in The Literary Criterion (Mysore, India), 2016, pp. 65–94
 "Trumpery and Social Darwinism," National Review Online, 9 August 2016: see <M.D. Aeschliman, National Review Online, archive>
 "Christopher Ricks and the Saving Remnant," National Review Online, 24 September 2016: see <M.D. Aeschliman, National Review Online, archive>
 "Three Great Critics: F.R. Leavis, T.S. Eliot, and C.S. Lewis" (see above), reprinted in F.R. Leavis: The Critic As Crusader: A Collection of Essays by Contemporary Critics, ed. C.N. Srinath,  R.Ramachandra, and E. Holman (Mysore, India: Dhvanyaloka, 2016)
 "The Heroism of E.D. Hirsch," National Review Online, 18 February 2017: see <M.D. Aeschliman, National Review Online, archive>
 "True and Beautiful," review of Roger Scruton, On Human Nature, National Review, 26 June 2017, p. 42
 "The Radical," review of Laura Dassow Walls, Henry David Thoreau: A Life, National Review, 14 August 2017, pp. 38–9 (and subsequently in expanded form in Essays in Criticism (Oxford), infra).
 "The Restoration of the Person and the Uses of Memory," National Review Online (NY), 7 October 2017 (text of lecture given to the Institute of Catholic Liberal Education, San Cresci, Tuscany, 7 August 2017).
 "Reductionism Rampant," National Review Online, 2 December 2017.
 "Faustian, Fantasist, Fraud," review of Frederick Crews, Freud: The Making of An Illusion, Modern Age (USA), 59, 4 (Fall 2017),  pp. 78–81.
 "Two Great Literary Women in Light of Today's Sexual-Harassment Scandals," National Review Online, 30 December 2017.
 "The Dissidence of Dissent," expanded version of "The Radical" (supra), in Essays in Criticism (Oxford), 68, 1 (January 2018), 135–143.
 "Lincoln and Leo XIII against the Nietzscheans," National Review Online, 21 April 2018.
 "Mimicry, Mania, and Memory: René Girard Remembered," National Review Online, 21 October 2018
 "Liberal Education and the Ideal University: a Yale Honor Roll." Lecture delivered at Yale University (USA), 2 November 2018.
 "Cultural Tourism as Pilgrimage," Semiotica (Toronto), Vol. 2018,  No. 225 (Nov. 2018), 245–252. (Address at doctoral summer school on UNESCO World Heritage Sites, Armeno (Novara), Italy, 8 September 2016)
 "Lionel Trilling in the Age of Enormity," National Review Online, 6 January 2019
 "Looking Back on Lionel Trilling," Podcast with R.R. Reno, for First Things (NY), recorded in New York City, 16 November 2018, on the occasion of the publication of Life in Culture: Selected Letters of Lionel Trilling, ed. Adam Kirsch: Lionel Trilling and the Great Tradition by R. R. Reno
 "An Eloquent Witness and Wit: David Berlinski on Human Nature," National Review Online, 15 February 2020
 "James Davison Hunter and the Inadequacy of Naturalism," National Review Online, 2 March 2019
 "Two Plagues in Lombardy," National Review Online, 11 April 2020
 "History as Wisdom: Thomas Carlyle vs. the 'Perfectibilarians'," National Review Online, 20 July 2019
 "That Hideous Strength"---C.S. Lewis's Fantasia of Consciousness at 75," Discovery Institute: Evolution News and Views, 16 August 2020
 "Literature as Praise, Resistance, and Consolation: Part I," National Review Online,  9 November 2019
 "Kenneth Clark's Civilisation After a Half Century," National Review Online, 30 November 2019
 The Restoration of Man: C.S. Lewis and the Continuing Case Against Scientism. New, augmented, third edition of The Restitution of Man, with a new Preface by Dr. James LeFanu and a new Introduction by the author. Seattle, Washington: Discovery Institute Press, 2019, 181 pp., 
 La restauration de l'homme: C.S. Lewis contre le scientisme, French translation by Hubert Darbon of The Restoration of Man, along with five previously published essays; Paris: Pierre Téqui, 2020, 289 pp., 
 "Malcolm Muggeridge, Marked by Mobility and a Search for Morality", National Review Online, 9 October 2020 
 "Don’t Forget Polish Suffering — and Heroism", National Review Online, 27 November 2020  
 "G. K. Chesterton and George Bernard Shaw: An Ambivalent Literary Relationship", National Review Online, 5 December 2020 
 "How Edward Said Reoriented the West", National Review Online, 13 May 2021 
 "Jacques Barzun, Historian for All Time", National Review Online, 30 May 2021 
 “Why G.K. Chesterton Liked America,” National Review Online, 8 August 2021 
"Sachiko, Shusaku Endo’s World-Historical Novel", National Review Online, 12 September 2021 
"On the Way with Hilaire Belloc", National Review Online, 1 January 2022
"Imperial Selves and Deteriorating Persons”, Web Exclusive, First Things (NY), 27 January 2022
“The Odyssey of Roosevelt Montas”, National Review Online, 20 February 2022
“Principled Pluralism in Education”, Modern Age, 64, 1 (Winter 2022), 13-16
“Darwinian Racism: The Angry Ape”, National Review Online, 27 March 2022
“What Orwell Learned from Chesterton”, Web Exclusive, First Things (NY), 17 May 2022
“Charles Dickens, the Bible, and Us”, National Review (print and online), 11 July 2022
“Understanding—and Misunderstanding—Daniel Bell”, National Review Online, 17 July 2022
“The Constitution Is Not Broken and Should Be Defended” National Review Online, 4 September 2022
“Educational Improvement: History vs. Fiction”, published in shorter form as a Web Exclusive as “Spare the Truth, Spoil the Child”, First Things (NY), 5 September 2022
“Modernity in the High Mugello,” First Things, Web Exclusive, 17 October 2022
“Everyone His Own Historian?” Review of J. Banner, The Ever-changing Past, National Review (print), 28 November 2022
“Horrors in Ukraine, Yesterday and Today,” National Review Online, 11 December 2022
Podcast with John J. Miller, The Great Books, Episode 261, 14 February 2023, Winter in Moscow, by Malcolm Muggeridge
“How It Was Said Before,” on Shakespeare, National Review (print), 20 February 2023
“Haiti’s Catholic Hero,” First Things, Web Exclusive, 22 February 2023

Reviews since 2019 

 Christopher O. Blum, "Recovering Our Reason," National Review, 30 September 2019
 James LeFanu, "Between Sapientia and Scientia: Michael Aeschliman's Profound Interpretation," Evolution News and Science Today, 9 September 2019
 George Gilder, "Michael Aeschliman and the Consolation of Man," Evolution News and Science Today, 16 September 2019
 David Klinghoffer, "Species Dysphoria: Former Archbishop of Canterbury on Aeschliman's Restoration of Man," Evolution News, 3 October 2019
 Chilton Williamson, Jr., "Christ in the Waste Land," Crisis Magazine, 25 November 2019
 Joseph Pearce, "Twelve Books for Christmas," The Imaginative Conservative, 3 December 2019
 Bernice Lerner, "Human Integrity," Touchstone (Chicago), July/August 2020, 46–8
 "Quand l’auteur de Narnia écrivait contre le transhumanisme", review by Paul Sugy of Aeschlimann's La restauration de l'homme: C.S. Lewis contre le scientisme, (French translation by Hubert Darbon of The Restoration of Man, along with five previously published essays; Paris: Pierre Téqui, 2020), Le Figaro Magazine (Paris), 6 March 2020, p. 42
 "Penseurs chrétiens - Des résistants pour aujourd’hui", France Catholique, 24 September 2020

References

1948 births
Living people
Boston University faculty
G. K. Chesterton
Charles Dickens
C. S. Lewis
American people of Swiss descent
Academic staff of the University of Lugano
University of Virginia faculty
Columbia College (New York) alumni
Columbia Graduate School of Arts and Sciences alumni
Tilton School alumni